Jonathan Sykes may refer to:
 Jonathan Sykes (footballer)
 Jonathan Sykes (engineer)